George Tyson, born George Okumu Otieno  (1973–2014) was a Kenyan filmmaker who worked mainly in Tanzania. A 'bongo movie' director, he was "regarded as one of the best commercial directors in the country" and as the "godfather of Bongowood".

He died in a car crash at Kibaigwa on 30 May 2014.

Filmography
 Dilemma, 2003
 Girlfriend - Filamu ya maisha na muziki, 2004
 Sabrina, 2004

References

1973 births
2014 deaths
Tanzanian film directors
Kenyan film directors
Kenyan film producers